The butterfly kingfish (Gasterochisma melampus) is an ocean-dwelling ray-finned bony fish in the mackerel family, Scombridae – a family which it shares with the tunas, mackerels, Spanish mackerels, and bonitos. Unlike the 50 species from those four tribes, however, this species is unique in that it is the only scombrid to be classified apart from the rest, into the subfamily Gasterochismatinae and genus Gasterochisma.

Although taxonomists and the Food and Agriculture Organization of the United Nations have accepted the name "butterfly kingfish", this fish has had many common names, including big-scaled mackerel, bigscale mackerel, butterfly mackerel, butterfly tuna, scaled tunny, scaly tuna, and others. In 1993, the U.S. Food and Drug Administration gave approval for this fish to be marketed simply as "mackerel".

Description
The juveniles of the butterfly kingfish are characterized by enormous pelvic fins that are longer than the length of its head, and that become more proportional as the fish grows. At any size, the pelvic fin tucks into a deep ventral groove, in much the same way as the first dorsal spines do in all scombrids. This species has very large cycloid scales, below which is a thick layer of fat. The swim bladder has two anterior projections that extend into the back of the skull, near the inner ear. This fish lacks the median keel on the caudal peduncle – it only has the characteristic pair of small keels on each side of the base of the caudal fin, as do other scombrids. It has 21 precaudal vertebrae, plus 23 caudal vertebrae.

Most bony fishes are ectothermic, or cold-blooded, but this species, much like the related tunas, is endothermic and is able to raise its body temperature to achieve a degree of thermoregulation. It has a brain heater organ derived from the lateral rectus eye muscle, which is distinct from that of the billfishes, whose heater is derived from their superior rectus muscles.

Etymology

Taxonomy
The evolutionary lineage of the butterfly kingfish is more primitive and quite different from that of the rest of the scombrids. Additionally, the morphology of this species is substantially different from that of the others – some suggest that it might belong in a different family altogether. At present, however, morphology and nuclear phylogeny provide support that Gasterochisma is sister to all other scombrids, and that both its genus, Gasterochisma, and its subfamily, Gasterochismatinae, remain as monotypic taxa under the family Scombridae.

The following cladogram shows the most likely evolutionary relationships between the butterfly kingfish and the tunas, mackerels, Spanish mackerels, and bonitos.

References
 
 Tony Ayling & Geoffrey Cox, Collins Guide to the Sea Fishes of New Zealand, (William Collins Publishers Ltd., Auckland, New Zealand 1982) 

Scombridae
Taxa named by John Richardson (naturalist)
Fish described in 1845